Pearls: Songs of Goffin and King is the 11th album by American singer-songwriter Carole King, released in 1980. It produced her last hit to date, "One Fine Day", which reached #12 on the charts.

Track listing

Personnel
 Carole King – lead vocals, piano (1, 2, 3, 5, 7, 10)
 Reese Wynans – keyboards
 Eric Johnson – lead guitar, rhythm guitar
 Christopher Cross – rhythm guitar (2, 6, 8)
 Mark Maniscalco – banjo
 Charles Larkey – bass guitar
 Steve Meador – drums
 Miguel Rivera – congas, percussion
 Bill Ginn – horn and string arrangements, conductor
 Akira Endo – strings director
 Richard Hardy – flute, alto saxophone, sax solos
 Tomás Ramírez – tenor saxophone
 Donald Knaub – bass trombone
 Michael Munday – trombone
 Ray Crisara – trumpet, cornet (8)
 Bobby Meyer – trumpet, cornet (8)
 Betty Whitlock – fiddle (9)
 Mark Hallman – backing vocals (6), guitar (10), harmonica (10)
 Oscar Ford Jr. – backing vocals (8)
 Gloria Hines – backing vocals (8)
 Deborah North – backing vocals (8)
 Lydia North – backing vocals (8)

Production
 Producers – Carole King and Mark Hallman
 Engineer – Chet Himes
 Assistant Engineer – James Tuttle
 Mastered by Bobby Hata at Warner Bros. Recording Studios (North Hollywood, CA).
 Art Direction and Design – Dick Reeves and John Wilson
 Photography – Sherry Goffin 
 Management and Direction – Michael Brovsky and Witt Stewart

Chart positions

References

External links
Carole King discography.

1980 albums
Carole King albums
Capitol Records albums